The 2022–23 season is the 124th season in the existence of Everton Football Club and the club's 69th consecutive season in the top flight of English football. In addition to the league, they also competed in the FA Cup and the EFL Cup.

Squad

Transfers

All fees stated underneath are including potential add-ons.

In

Out

Loans in

Loans out

Management team

Manager Frank Lampard, as well as coaches Joe Edwards, Paul Clement, Ashley Cole and Chris Jones have all left the club as of 23rd January 2023.

Pre-season and friendlies
Everton announced they would return to the United States for two pre-season friendlies against Arsenal and Minnesota United. On the club's return to the UK, the Toffees travel to Bloomfield Road to take on Blackpool. On July 12, Everton announced they would host Dynamo Kyiv in a pre-season friendly to raise funds for the Ukraine Humanitatian charities.

During mid-season, the Toffees announced they would be part of the inaugural Sydney Super Cup in November, against Celtic and Western Sydney Wanderers.

Pre-season

Mid-season

Competitions

Overall record

Premier League

League table

Results summary

Results by round

Matches

On 16 June, the Premier League fixtures were released.

FA Cup

The Toffees entered the competition in the third round and were drawn away to Manchester United.

EFL Cup

Everton entered the competition in the second round and were drawn away to Fleetwood Town.

Statistics

Appearances and goals

|-
! colspan=14 style=background:#dcdcdc; text-align:center| Goalkeepers

|-
! colspan=14 style=background:#dcdcdc; text-align:center| Defenders

|-
! colspan=14 style=background:#dcdcdc; text-align:center| Midfielders
|-

|-
! colspan=14 style=background:#dcdcdc; text-align:center| Forwards
|-

|-

|-

|-
! colspan=14 style=background:#dcdcdc; text-align:center| Players transferred/loaned out during the season
|-

|-

Goalscorers

{| class="wikitable sortable" style="text-align:center;"
|-
!"width:35px;"|
!"width:35px;"|
!"width:35px;"|
!"width:200px;"|Player
!"width:75px;"|Premier League
!"width:75px;"|FA Cup
!"width:75px;"|EFL Cup
!"width:75px;"|Total
|-
|rowspan=1| 1
| FW || 11 || align=left| 
| 4 || 0 || 2 || 6
|- 
|rowspan=1| 2
| FW || 10 || align=left| 
| 3 || 0 || 0 || 3
|-
|rowspan=2| 3
| FW || 7 || align=left| 
| 3 || 0 || 0 || 3
|-
| DF || 30 || align=left| 
| 1 || 1|| 0 || 2
|-
|rowspan=5| 4
| MF || 8 || align=left| 
| 1 || 0 || 0 || 1
|-
| FW || 9 || align=left| 
| 1 || 0 || 0 || 1
|-
| DF || 13 || align=left| 
| 1 || 0 || 0 || 1
|-
| FW || 20 || align=left| 
| 1 || 0 || 0 || 1
|-
| MF || 17 || align=left| 
| 1 || 0 || 0 || 1
|-
|rowspan=5| 4
| DF || 2 || align=left| 
| 1 || 0 || 0 || 1
|-
| DF || 23 || align=left| 
| 1 || 0 || 0 || 1
|-
| MF || 16 || align=left| 
| 1 || 0 || 0 || 1
|-
|colspan="4"| Own goals || 1 || 0 || 0 || 1
|- class="sortbottom"
!colspan="4"|Total || 20 || 1|| 2 || 18
|-

Assists

{| class="wikitable sortable" style="text-align:center;"
|-
!"width:35px;"|
!"width:35px;"|
!"width:35px;"|
!"width:200px;"|Player
!"width:75px;"|Premier League
!"width:75px;"|FA Cup
!"width:75px;"|EFL Cup
!"width:75px;"|Total
|-
|rowspan=1| 1
| FW || 17 || align=left| 
| 5 || 0 || 1 || 6
|-
|rowspan=1| 2
| MF || 8 || align=left| 
| 2 || 0 || 0 || 2
|-
|rowspan=2| 2
| GK || 1 || align=left| 
| 1 || 0 || 0 || 1
|-
| DF || 30 || align=left| 
| 1 || 0 || 0 || 1
|-
!colspan="4"|Total || 9 || 0 || 1 || 10
|-

Clean sheets

{|class="wikitable sortable" style="text-align: center;"
|-
!Rank
!Name
!Premier League
!FA Cup
!EFL Cup
!Total
!Played Games
|-
|rowspan=2| 1
|align=left| Asmir Begović
| 1 || 0 || 1 || 2 || 2
|-
|align=left| Jordan Pickford
| 2 || 0 || 0 || 2 || 11
|-
!colspan=2|Total!!3!!0!!1!!4!!13

Disciplinary record

{|class="wikitable sortable" style="text-align: center;"
|-
!rowspan="2" style="width:50px;"|Rank
!rowspan="2" style="width:50px;"|Position
!rowspan="2" style="width:180px;"|Name
!colspan="2"|Premier League
!colspan="2"|FA Cup
!colspan="2"|EFL Cup
!colspan="2"|Total
|-
!style="width:30px;"|
!style="width:30px;"|
!style="width:30px;"|
!style="width:30px;"|
!style="width:30px;"|
!style="width:30px;"|
!style="width:30px;"|
!style="width:30px;"|
|-
|rowspan=1| 1
| FW ||align=left| Anthony Gordon

| 6 || 0

| 0 || 0

| 0 || 0

! 6 !! 0
|-
|rowspan=3| 2
| GK ||align=left| Jordan Pickford

| 3 || 0

| 0 || 0

| 0 || 0

! 3 !! 0
|-
| MF ||align=left| Amadou Onana

| 3 || 0

| 0 || 0

| 0 || 0

! 3 !! 0
|-
| MF ||align=left| Idrissa Gueye

| 3 || 0

| 0 || 0

| 0 || 0

! 3 !! 0
|-
|rowspan=4| 5
| DF ||align=left| James Tarkowski

| 2 || 0

| 0 || 0

| 0 || 0

! 2 !! 0
|-
| FW ||align=left| Dwight McNeil

| 2 || 0

| 0 || 0

| 0 || 0

! 2 !! 0
|-
| MF ||align=left| Tom Davies

| 2 || 0

| 0 || 0

| 0 || 0

! 2 !! 0
|-
| DF ||align=left| Vitaliy Mykolenko

| 2 || 0

| 0 || 0

| 0 || 0

! 2 !! 0
|-
|rowspan=10| 9
| DF ||align=left| Nathan Patterson

| 1 || 0

| 0 || 0

| 0 || 0

! 1 !! 0
|-
| DF ||align=left| Mason Holgate

| 1 || 0

| 0 || 0

| 0 || 0

! 1 !! 0
|-
| FW ||align=left| Dominic Calvert-Lewin

| 1 || 0

| 0 || 0

| 0 || 0

! 1 !! 0
|-
| FW ||align=left| Demarai Gray

| 1 || 0

| 0 || 0

| 0 || 0

! 1 !! 0
|-
| DF ||align=left| Yerry Mina

| 1 || 0

| 0 || 0

| 0 || 0

! 1 !! 0
|-
| FW ||align=left| Alex Iwobi

| 1 || 0

| 0 || 0

| 0 || 0

! 1 !! 0
|-
| FW ||align=left| Neal Maupay

| 0 || 0

| 0 || 0

| 1 || 0

! 1 !! 0
|-
| DF ||align=left| Rúben Vinagre

| 0 || 0

| 0 || 0

| 1 || 0

! 1 !! 0
|-
| DF ||align=left| Conor Coady

| 1 || 0

| 0 || 0

| 0 || 0

! 1 !! 0
|-
| MF ||align=left| James Garner

| 1 || 0

| 0 || 0

| 0 || 0

! 1 !! 0
|-
!colspan=3|Total!!32!!0!!0!!0!!1!!0!!33!!0

See also
 2022–23 in English football
 List of Everton F.C. seasons

References 

Everton F.C. seasons
Everton